Muren is an unincorporated community in Patoka Township, Pike County, in the U.S. state of Indiana.

History
A post office was established at Muren in 1905, and remained in operation until it was discontinued in 1910.

Geography

References

Unincorporated communities in Pike County, Indiana
Unincorporated communities in Indiana